Leonard Gabas Mayaen (March 14, 1953 – March 31, 2016) was a Filipino politician and lawyer. He served as the Governor of Mountain Province from 1998 until 2001 and again from 2010 until his death in 2016. Governor Mayaen died in office from cardiac arrest on March 31, 2016, during his second term. At the time of his death, Governor Mayaen was running unopposed for re-election to a third term in the forthcoming Mountain Province gubernatorial election on May 9, 2016.

Early life and education
Mayaen was born in Besao, Mountain Province, on March 14, 1953, to a poor family. His family soon moved to Mount Data in nearby Bauko, Mountain Province, where his parents found employment on vegetable farms. He attended Mount Data Elementary School, where he was named his class' valedictorian. Mayaen then completed law school.

Career
In 1980, Mayaen left his position as a teacher at Tublay School of Home Economics to establish his own law office. He entered politics in 1988 when he was elected as a Mountain Province board member.

Mayaen was elected the Vice Governor of Mountain Province in 1992. He won re-election as Vice Governor in 1995. In 1998, Mayaen was elected Governor of Mountain Province, a position he held from 1998 to 2001 for one-term. He lost his gubernatorial re-election bid in 2001.

Leonard Mayaen launched a political comeback nearly a decade later when he was once again elected Governor in 2010. In 2013, Mayaen won re-election in a landslide victory. Governor Mayaen was running unopposed for a third, and final, term in the upcoming gubernatorial election on May 9, 2016, when he unexpectedly died in office.

Death
Governor Leonard Mayaen died in office of a heart attack on March 31, 2016, at the age of 63. He was found unresponsive on the floor of his bedroom in the Mountain Province Mansion House. Mayaen was taken to Bontoc General Hospital. The Governor was then airlifted by the Philippine Air Force to Notre Dame De Chartres Hospital in Baguio, where he was pronounced dead by physicians. He was survived by his wife, Sonia Gawe Mayaen, and their six children. Governor Mayaen was buried at a family cemetery in Pinsao, Baguio, on April 8, 2016. He was succeeded in office by acting Governor Boni Lacwasan until a successor could be elected.

References

1953 births
2016 deaths
Governors of Mountain Province
Politicians from Mountain Province
20th-century Filipino lawyers